Anuch (also Romanized as Anūch; also known as Anūj) is a village in Sefidkuh Rural District, Samen District, Malayer County, Hamadan Province, Iran. At the 2006 census, its population was 1,927, in 476 families.

References 

Populated places in Malayer County